For the state pageant affiliated with Miss Teen USA, see Miss Illinois Teen USA

The Miss Illinois' Teen competition is the pageant that selects the representative for the U.S. state of Illinois in the Miss America's Teen pageant.

Mia Fritsch-Anderson of Chicago was crowned Miss Illinois' Outstanding Teen on June 10, 2022 at the Marion Cultural and Civic Center in Marion, Illinois. She competed for the title of Miss America's Outstanding Teen 2023 at the Hyatt Regency Dallas in Dallas, Texas on August 12, 2022.

In January of 2023, the official name of the pageant was changed from Miss Illinois’ Outstanding Teen, to Miss Illinois’ Teen, in accordance with the national pageant.

Results summary 
The year in parentheses indicated year of Miss America's Outstanding Teen competition the award/placement was garnered.

Awards

Preliminary awards 
 Preliminary Talent: MerrieBeth Cox (2008)
 Preliminary Evening Wear/On-Stage Question: MerrieBeth Cox (2008), Summer Robbins (2012)

Non-finalist awards 
 Non-finalist Evening Wear/OSQ: Peyton Newman (2019)
 Non-finalist Interview: Summer Robbins (2011), Imani P. Muse (2020)

Winners

References

External links
 Official website

Illinois
Illinois culture
Women in Illinois
Annual events in Illinois